Laelaps is a genus of common parasitic mites in the family Laelapidae. Species, with their hosts, include:
Laelaps acuminata – Oecomys
Laelaps agilis – Rattus
Laelaps alaskensis – Blarina, Dicrostonyx, Lemmiscus, Lemmus, Microtus, Mustela, Myodes, Myotis, Napaeozapus, Ochrotomys, Ondatra, Onychomys, Parascalops, Peromyscus, Phenacomys, Poliocitellus, Sorex, Synaptomys, Thomomys
Laelaps boultoni – Neacomys, Sigmodon, Oligoryzomys, Oecomys, Heteromys
Laelaps castroi – Oligoryzomys
Laelaps clethrionomydis – Microtus, Myodes
Laelaps conula – Rhipidomys
Laelaps crinigera – Oryzomyini
Laelaps dearmasi – Zygodontomys
Laelaps differens
Laelaps echidnina  – Rattus, Didelphis, Sigmodon, Mus, Peromyscus, Sylvilagus
Laelaps evansi – Neofiber
Laelaps exceptionalis – "wild rat"
Laelaps flexa – Microryzomys
Laelaps giganteus – Lemniscomys
Laelaps incilis – Microtus, Neotamias, Peromyscus
Laelaps kochi – Blarina, Corynorhinus, Dicrostonyx, Dipodomys, Glaucomys, Microtus, Mustela, Myodes, Napaeozapus, Neotamias, Neovison, Neurotrichus, Ondatra, Peromyscus, Phenacomys, Sigmodon, Sorex, Synaptomys, Tamias, Zapus
Laelaps lavieri – Mus
Laelaps lemmi – Lemmus
Laelaps liberiensis – Mastomys
Laelaps manguinhosi – Holochilus, Nectomys, Neusticomys, and various other mammals
Laelaps mazzai – Calomys, Oligoryzomys
Laelaps multispinosa – Castor, Didelphis, Microtus, Mustela, Neovison, Ondatra, Peromyscus, Procyon
Laelaps muricola – Mastomys
Laelaps muris – Microtus, Ondatra
Laelaps navasi – Oryzomyini
Laelaps nuttalli – Mus, Ochrotomys, Peromyscus, Rattus, Sciurus
Laelaps ovata – Nephelomys
Laelaps paulistanensis – Rhipidomys, Oryzomyini
Laelaps pilifer – Oryzomyini
Laelaps spicata – Oryzomyini
Laelaps stupkai – Synaptomys
Laelaps surcomata – Rhipidomys
Laelaps thori

Unnamed or unidentified species have been reported on Gerbilliscus robustus and Acomys wilsoni in Tanzania and on the marsh rice rat (Oryzomys palustris) in Florida and Georgia.

Synonym of Dryptosaurus
In 1866, an incomplete theropod dinosaur skeleton (ANSP 9995) was found in New Jersey by workers in a quarry belonging to the upper part of the New Egypt Formation. Paleontologist E.D. Cope described the remains, naming the creature "Laelaps" ("storm wind", after the dog in Greek mythology that never failed to catch what it was hunting). "Laelaps" became one of the first dinosaurs described from North America (following Hadrosaurus, Aublysodon and Trachodon). Subsequently, it was discovered that the name "Laelaps" had already been given to a genus of mite, and Cope's lifelong rival O.C. Marsh changed the name in 1877 to Dryptosaurus.

See also
List of parasites of the marsh rice rat

References

Literature cited 
Furman, D.P. 1972. Laelapid mites (Laelapidae: Laelapinae) from Venezuela. Brigham Young University Science Bulletin 17(3):1–58.
Morlan, H.B. 1952. Host relationships and seasonal abundance of some Southwest Georgia ectoparasites (subscription required). American Midland Naturalist 48(1):74–93.
Stanley, W.T., Rogers, M.A., Senzota, R.B.M., Mturi, F.A., Kihaule, P.M., Moehlman, P.D. and O'Connor, B.M. 2007. Surveys of small mammals in Tarangire National Park, Tanzania. Journal of East African Natural History 96(1):47–71.
Whitaker, J.O. and Wilson, N. 1974. Host and distribution lists of mites (Acari), parasitic and phoretic, in the hair of wild mammals of North America, north of Mexico (subscription required). American Midland Naturalist 91(1):1–67.
Whitaker, J.O., Walters, B.L., Castor, L.K., Ritzi, C.M. and Wilson, N. 2007. Host and distribution lists of mites (Acari), parasitic and phoretic, in the hair or on the skin of North American wild mammals north of Mexico: records since 1974. Faculty Publications from the Harold W. Manter Laboratory of Parasitology, University of Nebraska, Lincoln 1:1–173.
Worth, C.B. 1950. Observations on ectoparasites of some small mammals in Everglades National Park and Hillsborough County, Florida (subscription required). The Journal of Parasitology 36(4):326–335.

Laelapidae
Parasites of rodents